The Constantinople Agreement (also known as the Straits Agreement) comprised a secret exchange of diplomatic correspondence between members of the Triple Entente from 4 March to 10 April 1915 during World War I. France and Great Britain promised to give Constantinople and the Dardanelles (which at the time were part of the Ottoman Empire) to the Russian Empire in the event of victory.  Britain and France put forward their own claims, to an increased sphere of influence in Persia (modern Iran) in the case of Britain and to the annexation of Syria (including Palestine) and Cilicia for France, all sides also agreeing that the governance of the Holy Places and Arabia would be under independent Muslim rule. The Greek government was neutral, but in 1915 it negotiated with the Allies, offering soldiers and especially a geographical launching point for attacks on the Turkish Straits.  Greece itself wanted control of Constantinople. Russia vetoed the Greek proposal, because its main war goal was to control the Straits, and take control of Constantinople.

Though the Allied attempt to seize the area in the Gallipoli Campaign failed, Constantinople was nevertheless occupied by the victorious Allies at the end of the war in 1918. By that time, however, the Russian Revolution had brought about Russian withdrawal from the war, and as it was no longer one of the Allied Powers the agreement was not implemented. Its existence had been revealed by the Bolshevik government in 1917.

Historical background 

Access to the Turkish Straits was governed by the 1841 London Straits Convention which stipulated the closure of the straits to warships and, after the Crimean War, by the Treaty of Paris (1856) which made universal the principle of commercial freedom at the same time as forbidding any militarization in and around the Black Sea, later amended by the Treaty of London (1871) and reaffirmed in the Treaty of Berlin (1878).

In early 1907, in the talks leading up to the Anglo-Russian Convention, Count Alexander Izvolsky, then Russian Minister of Foreign Affairs, raised the question of the Straits, and talks were carried on in London through the Russian ambassador, Count Alexander Benckendorff. Little is known but the "suggestion appears to have been made that Russia should have free egress from the Black Sea through the Straits, while other powers should have the right to send their vessels of war into the Straits without going into the Black Sea" together with some talk of "Russia's occupying the Bosphorus and England the Dardanelles, after which the Straits might be opened to other warships as well." In the event, nothing came of the discussions at the time.

On 12 October 1908, the Russian Ambassador to France, Aleksandr Nelidov in a conversation with the British Ambassador to France, Lord Bertie, said that since Japan would not allow Russia to keep a Pacific fleet, and since the Baltic was practically closed throughout the winter, it was essential for Russia that the Black Sea should be made "the home for the Russian fleet whence she can move to the Mediterranean, the Baltic and the Far East as necessity may require."

Alexander Izvolsky, the Russian Foreign Minister, in the latter part of 1908 was able to get conditional support for a change in the Straits regime from Austro-Hungarian Foreign Minister Alois Lexa von Aehrenthal, Italian Minister of Foreign Affairs Tommaso Tittoni and the German Ambassador to Paris, Wilhelm von Schoen as well as from Secretary of State for Foreign Affairs Sir Edward Grey, the latter on 14 October 1908, being clearest on the subject while at the same time indicating that Turkish agreement was a prerequisite. 

During the Bosnian Crisis of 1908, in the Italo-Turkish War of 1911/12 as well as during the Balkan Wars of 1912/13, Russia made attempts to obtain the opening of the straits for Russian warships but failed for want of support from the Great powers.
In April/May 1912, the straits were closed for some weeks and in response to subsequent threats of closure, Russia indicated that it would take action in the event of a prolonged closure.

At the outbreak of war, the Ottoman Empire was diplomatically isolated; it had sought an alliance with Britain at the end of 1911 and between May and July 1914 with France, Russia and on 22 July with Germany, to no avail. On 30 July, Russian Minister of Foreign Affairs Sergey Sazonov instructed Benckendorff: it is a matter of the highest importance for us that Turkey should not receive the two dreadnoughts..point out to the English government the immense importance of this matter for us, and energetically insist upon the retention of these two ships in England." First Lord of the Admiralty Winston Churchill had by then already decided on requisition and when the Turkish ambassador protested on 1 August, he was informed that "in view of the serious situation abroad it was not possible to allow a battleship to leave these waters and pass into the hands of a foreign buyer".

The pursuit of Goeben and Breslau (two German warships) by the Royal Navy led to their being allowed to enter the Dardanelles on the 10 August 1914.

Details 

Historian Dmitrii Likharev, analysing key contributions in the historiography of the subject points to contributions of C. Jay Smith who obtained access to the Asquith papers in the 1960s and to William Renzi in 1970 who made use of records released by the British National Archives to date Britain's promise of Constantinople to the Russians as of November 1914  and its genesis as being earlier in September 
, prior to the Ottoman entry into the war.

From 4 March to 10 April 1915, the Triple Entente (Britain, France, and Russia) secretly discussed how to divide up the lands of the Ottoman Empire. Britain was to control an even larger zone in Iran while Russia would get the Ottoman capital, Constantinople. The Dardanelles were also promised to Russia. The language of the agreement described the following boundaries:
...the city of Constantinople, the western bank of the Bosphorus, of the Sea of Marmara and of the Dardanelles, as well as southern Thrace to the Enez-Midye line... and... that part of the Asiatic shore that lies between the Bosphorus, the Sakarya River and a point to be determined on the Gulf of Izmit, and the islands of the Sea of Marmara, the Imbros Islands and the Tenedos Islands.

Even though the British and the French sought to limit Russian claims, they were not able to do so and also had to contend with the possibility that Russia might make a separate peace with the Central Powers. The agreement was one of a series of agreements regarding the partition of the Ottoman Empire by the Triple Entente and Italy following the war, including the Treaty of London (1915), the Sykes–Picot Agreement (1916) and the Agreement of Saint-Jean-de-Maurienne (April to August 1917).

The British Gallipoli Campaign (1915–16) was aimed at seizing the Dardanelles and Constantinople but was defeated by the Ottomans, and the Allies did not gain control of the region until occupying it in November 1918, after the end of the war. By that time, the Communist Bolsheviks had seized power in Russia during the October Revolution of 1917 and had signed a separate peace with the Central Powers in March 1918, dropping out of the war. As the Allies therefore no longer considered Russia among their number, and, indeed, did not even recognize the legitimacy of the Bolshevik government, the agreement was never implemented.

See also 

 Diplomatic history of World War I

References

Footnotes

Citations

Bibliography 
 Fitzgerald, Edward Peter. "France's Middle Eastern Ambitions, the Sykes–Picot Negotiations, and the Oil Fields of Mosul." The Journal of Modern History 66.4 (1994): 697–725. 
 Fromkin, David. A Peace to End All Peace. N.p.: Henry Holt & Company, Incorporated, 2001. Print.
 Helmreich, Paul C. "Italy and the Anglo-French Repudiation of the 1917 St. Jean de Maurienne Agreement." The Journal of Modern HIstory 48.2 (1976): 99–139. 
Pınar Üre: Constantinople Agreement, in: 1914-1918-online. International Encyclopedia of the First World War.

1915 in the Ottoman Empire
Treaties concluded in 1915
1910s in Istanbul
World War I treaties
Treaties of the United Kingdom (1801–1922)
Treaties of the Russian Empire
Treaties of the French Third Republic
1915 in Europe